Mount Hart is a mountain over  high, standing  northwest of Mount Chider in the Admiralty Mountains of Victoria Land, Antarctica. It was mapped by the United States Geological Survey from surveys and U.S. Navy air photos, 1960–64, and was named by the Advisory Committee on Antarctic Names for Lieutenant Vemon D. Hart, officer in charge of the U.S. Navy Squadron VX-6 winter party at McMurdo Station, 1968.

References

Mountains of Victoria Land
Borchgrevink Coast